Diarsia sinuosa is a moth of the family Noctuidae. It is found in Taiwan.

The wingspan is 26–30 mm.

References

Moths described in 1912
Diarsia